XHRAF-FM is a noncommercial radio station on 98.3 FM in Rafael Delgado, Veracruz. It is owned by Cultura es lo Nuestro, A.C. and known as Radio Banana.

XHRAF is simulcast on XHCAY-FM 102.9 in Acayucan.

History
The social concessions for XHRAF and XHCAY were approved on July 1, 2016. The stations began broadcasting at the end of 2017.

References

Radio stations in Veracruz